William Arthur Deacon  (6 Apr 1890 - 5 August 1977) was a Canadian literary critic and editor. Born in Pembroke, Ontario in 1890, he studied in Winnipeg, Manitoba to be a lawyer, but eventually became a book review editor, and "aimed to become the first full-time book reviewer in Canada". He worked for the Manitoba Free Press (1921), Saturday Night (1922–28), the Toronto Mail and Empire (1928–36) and The Globe and Mail (1936–61). He died in 1977 in Toronto, Ontario.

Selected works
Pens and Pirates (1923)
Poteen and Other Essays (1926)
The Four Jameses (1927)
My vision of Canada (1933)

References

1890 births
1977 deaths
People from Pembroke, Ontario
Canadian literary critics
Literary editors
Writers from Ontario
Writers from Winnipeg
The Globe and Mail people
Canadian editors
20th-century Canadian male writers
20th-century Canadian essayists
Canadian male essayists